Ralph J. Scott, also formerly known as Fireboat #2, is a  fireboat that was attached to the Los Angeles Fire Department serving the Port of Los Angeles.  She was retired in 2003 after 78 years and replaced by Warner L. Lawrence.  Ralph J. Scott is undergoing restoration near the Los Angeles Maritime Museum in San Pedro.  On 30 June 1989, she was listed as a National Historic Landmark. She is currently located at the Los Angeles Fire Department, Fire Station 112, at 444 South Harbor Blvd, Berth 86, San Pedro, California.

Description
Her namesake is a former Chief Engineer of the LAFD.

On 6 May 1924 voters approved a $400,000 bond issue for construction of a fireboat, a station to house it and auxiliary apparatus.

Following completion of L.E. Caverly's designs, dated 31 January 1925, a $214,000 contract was awarded to the Los Angeles Shipbuilding and Drydock Corp. (Todd Shipyard) in San Pedro.  The contract called for a 1 October 1925 delivery date.  On 25 October 1925, Mrs. Ralph J. Scott christened Los Angeles City No. 2.

Commissioned 2 December 1925, Los Angeles City No. 2 went into service with a crew of 14, including a captain, a pilot, a mate, two engineers and nine firemen.

The triple screw, white-painted fireboat was riveted steel construction.  Her length is 99.3 feet, beam 19 feet, depth of hold 9 feet, 152 gross tons and fuel capacity 2,156 gallons.

Originally Los Angeles City No. 2 was powered by seven 350-horsepower, 6-cylinder in-line Winton gasoline engines. The four other Wintons operated the forward-mounted pumps. Increased pumping capacity resulted from the dual capability of the two wing propulsion engines when they were switched from propulsion to pumping mode. There are six Byron Jackson four-stage centrifugal pumps mounted in pairs forward of the propulsion system.

In 1945 the seven Winton propulsion engines were replaced by Hall Scott engines.  Two  V-12 Hall Scott Defenders drive the outboard screws.  A  6-cylinder in-line Hall Scott Invader drives the center screw.

The six Byron Jackson four-stage centrifugal pumps, mounted in pairs forward of the propulsion system are driven as follows: 
 Pumps numbers 1 through 4 are driven by one of the 275 hp 6-cylinder in-line Hall Scott Invaders.
 Pumps numbers 5 and 6 are driven by one of the 625 hp V-12 Hall Scott Defenders.

Carrying  of fuel, the fireboat featured a safety system that completely changed the air in the engine room every five minutes as a precaution against leaking gasoline vapors. A further safeguard against below-deck fires was a bank of 18 carbon dioxide extinguishing agent cylinders forward of the water tower.

Beginning in 1975 the gasoline engines were replaced with diesels and by 1978 two  V-12 Cummins, three  6-cylinder in-line Cummins and two  V-12 2-cycle Detroits power the fireboat.

Ralph J. Scott carried breathing apparatus, forcible entry tools, heavy stream appliances, a bank of eighteen  CO2 cylinders (now removed), flood light, smoke ejector equipment, syphon ejectors, drag and grappling hooks, two  Mystery nozzles, and tips up to 6 inches for the largest deck turret. Four reels carry  of various sized hose. She was equipped with 24 hose outlets (12 port and 12 starboard) and 5 large deck guns. Big Bertha, mounted on the wheelhouse could deliver  via a  nozzle.

Notable fires

3 March 1926
Los Angeles City No. 2 battled her first major fire when the fully loaded lumber schooner Sierra burned at the E. K. Wood Lumber Company wharf, San Pedro.  It took 26 Los Angeles city fire companies and 5 fireboats over two hours to extinguish this difficult fire in the San Pedro area.  First arriving fire units reported  of Berth 77 on fire and spreading to adjacent boats.  Loss estimated to be over $1,500,000 to the wharf and six boats.  No injuries were reported and the fire was under investigation.

July 1947
Los Angeles City No. 2 maneuvered alongside of Berth 154, the American President Lines pier and warehouse, where she succeeded in stopping the fire at this point.  A secondary fire was the burning tanker, SS Markay.  Los Angeles City No. 2 used her forward turret, Big Bertha and Rail Standees.

29 June 1954
Los Angeles City No. 2 was put in action during the fire at the San Pedro Marine Terminal of the Tidewater Associated Oil Co., cooling endangered tanks during a three-alarm fire.  Starting at 6:25 p.m., explosions and fires quickly engulfed 11 of the 17 storage tanks in the facility.  Moored beside the boat was Fireboat No. 3.

24 February 1967
Ralph J. Scott attacked simulated dock fires, berth 128.  This was part of "Operation West Basin" training program.

20 June 1970
SS Pontos cargo ship fire, which occurred at Berth 49 at the harbor.

December 1976
The 60,000 ton oil tanker  explosion.

Station
One of the few covered boathouses built for American fireboats, Ralph J. Scotts original housing (later known as Fire Station 112) became a waterfront landmark until its demolition in 1986, to make way for a new cargo container complex.

The new, dramatic, award-winning building of Fire Station #112 was designed to shelter Ralph J Scott, while allowing for viewing by visitors. As of 2012, the weathered boat sits up in a cradle behind the station, awaiting funding and man-power necessary to complete the restoration process. The Port of Los Angeles is planning to develop a new facility to house the restored vessel.

Fire Station 112 has exhibits on the history of L.A. fireboats, and Ralph J. Scott in particular, explaining the construction and varied uses of this most unusual vessel.

Appearances in popular culture

The fireboat was featured in Visiting... with Huell Howser Episode 414.

See also
 List of Los Angeles Historic-Cultural Monuments in the Harbor area

References

External links

 
 

Fireboats of California
National Historic Landmarks in California
Ships on the National Register of Historic Places in Los Angeles
San Pedro, Los Angeles
Museum ships in California
1925 ships